The 2022 Missouri State Bears football team represented Missouri State University as a member of the Missouri Valley Football Conference (MVFC) during the 2022 NCAA Division I FCS football season. They were led by third-year head coach Bobby Petrino and played their home games at Robert W. Plaster Stadium in Springfield, Missouri. This was the Bears 116th season overall and their 37th season as a member of the MVFC.

Previous season

Missouri State entered the year with high expectations after making their first playoff appearance. They were predicted to finish in 6th place in the MVFC Standings. They finished the year with an 8–4 record and finished 2nd in the MVFC with a 6-2 conference record. They returned to the playoffs for the second straight year and hosted their first game since 1990. They lost in the first round to UT Martin 32–31. QB Jason Shelley won the conference Offensive Player of the Year award and Newcomer of the Year award in his first season. They finished the season ranked 14th in both Coaches and STATS poll.

Preseason

MVFC Media Poll
The media picked the Bears to finish in 3rd place. This is the highest ranking for the Bears since 1996 when they were selected 2nd.

Preseason Awards
Missouri State had eight players selected to the 2022 All-MVFC Preseason Team. Three from the defense, three from the offense, and two from the specialists. Seven players were picked to the first team and one to the second team. 

Preseason All-MVFC Team

Award Watch Lists

Personnel

Coaching staff

Roster

Schedule

Rankings

References

Missouri State
Missouri State Bears football seasons
Missouri State Bears football